Jasper House National Historic Site, in Jasper National Park, Alberta, is the site of a trading post on the Athabasca River that functioned in two different locations from 1813 to 1884 as a major staging and supply post for travel through the Canadian Rockies.

The post was originally named Rocky Mountain House, but was renamed to avoid confusion with the Rocky Mountain House trading post on the North Saskatchewan River, becoming "Jasper's House" after the postmaster, Jasper Hawes, who operated the post from 1814 to 1817. The first location is believed to have been at the outlet of Brûlé Lake, downstream from the present site. The second Jasper House was established at the northern end of Jasper Lake in 1830, primarily serving travellers crossing Yellowhead Pass or Athabasca Pass.

The site operated until 1853, and was occasionally used until 1858 when it was reopened seasonally by Henry John Moberly, who operated it into the 1860s. The post was officially closed in 1884 after years of inactivity. From 1891 or 1892 to 1894 the house was used by miner Lewis Swift. The building was destroyed in 1909 when its lumber was used to make a raft by surveyors for the Grand Trunk Pacific Railway.  Apart from a small cemetery, no significant ruins remain. It was designated a national historic site in 1924, and is marked by a commemorative stone and plaque.

References

External links
 Parks Canada site 
 Management Plans, National Historic Sites of the Mountain Parks, evaluation of the Information Centre (Section 3.1)

National Historic Sites in Alberta
Jasper National Park
North West Company
Commercial buildings completed in 1830
Former buildings and structures in Canada
Hudson's Bay Company trading posts
Forts or trading posts on the National Historic Sites of Canada register
Fur trade National Historic Sites of Canada
1830 establishments in the British Empire